Reject is a 7 inch split EP by American punk rock band Anti-Flag and American ska punk band Against All Authority, released in 1996.

Though the original EP is hard to find in music stores, due to its DIY release, it can be found spread about the internet on music-sharing sites.

Track listing
Side A (Anti-Flag)
 "The Truth" – 2:32
Later released on Their System Doesn't Work for You
"Anti-Violent" – 2:57
Later released on Their System Doesn't Work for You
"Daddy Was a Rich Man Part II" – 1:10
Condensed version of the track off Die for the Government

Side B (Against All Authority)
"Nothing To Lose" – 2:04
Later released on 24 Hour Roadside Resistance
"When It Comes Down" – 1:35
Later released on Nothing New for Trash Like You
"Haymarket Square" – 2:08
Later released on Nothing New for Trash Like You

1996 EPs
Against All Authority albums
Anti-Flag albums
Split EPs
A-F Records albums